Yanshuai Town is a rural town in Cangyuan Va Autonomous County, Yunnan, China.

Name
The word Yanshuai is transliteration in Wa language. Yanshuai is named in memory of Zhao Yanshuai, the founder of Yanshuai stockaded village.

History
Yanshuai is a tribe of the Wa people. In 1890, the Qing army marched to the area. Yanshuai District was established in 1936. It was upgraded to a town 1945. In 1949, the Communist Party established the Cangyuan County Provisional People's Government. On June 15, 1951, the People's Liberation Army and the Republic of China Armed Forces fought in Yanshuai Town. The Republic of China Armed Forces were defeated and evacuated to Myanmar. In 1968, it was renamed Hongyan Commune and then renamed Hongjiu Commune in the next year. In 1971 it was renamed Yanshuai Commune. In 1988, it reverted to its former name of Yanshuai Town. In August 2005, Tuanjie Township was incorporated into Yanshuai Town.

Administrative division
As of 2017, the town is divided into 22 villages: Yanshuai Village, Dongmeng Village, Huangguo Village, Lianhe Village, Yanbing Village, Xinhua Village, Jianshe Village, Hemeng Village, Zhonghemeng Village, Henan Village, Xinzhai Village, Tuanjie Village, Dongmi Village, Bantuo Village, Bannai Village, Gongman Village, Heke Village, Sainong Village, Anhai Village, Anguai Village, Xile Village, and Baling Village.

Geography
There are a number of popular mountains located immediately adjacent to the townsite which include Mount Gongdaogelongya, Mount Dongmi, and Mount Gonggei.

The Lameng River, Hemeng River and Xiaohei River, tributaries of the Lancang River, flow through the town.

Economy
Agriculture and forestry also play roles in the local economy. The main cash crops are tea, sugarcane, tobacco, walnuts, macadamia nuts and coffee.

Education
The town has 20 primary schools and 2 middle schools.

Transportation
The National Highway G214 passes across the eastern town.

References

Divisions of Cangyuan Va Autonomous County